Tinacrucis atopa is a species of moth of the family Tortricidae. It is found in the Cauca valley in Colombia.

The wingspan is about 30 mm. The ground colour of the forewings is orange yellow, but whiter along the costa. The markings are dark brown. The hindwings are pale yellow orange with dark brown spots along the wing edge, at the base of the wing, in the anal area and along the median cell.

Etymology
The species name refers to its separate position and is derived from Greek atopos (meaning not on its own).

References

Moths described in 2008
Atteriini
Moths of South America
Taxa named by Józef Razowski